Vito Delsante (born 1973) is an American comic book writer, known for his work on characters such as Batman, Wolverine and Scooby-Doo.

Early life
Vito Delsante was born in 1973 in Staten Island, New York, United States. He attended high school in Ford City, Pennsylvania, and the University of Pittsburgh. He now resides in Brooklyn, New York.

Career
Delsante worked for the Canadian comics company Speakeasy Comics in a public relations capacity prior to their closing doors in the Spring of 2006, and was seen by some as the only public face in the company's final days. He was also a creator at Speakeasy, with part one of the six part series Fallout with Dean Haspiel printed as a back-up to Beowulf #7 before the series was cancelled as a result of the publisher's closing. With the closing of the publisher, the future for Fallout is uncertain.

His first major creator-owned title, The Mercury Chronicles with artist Mike Lilly, was rumored for publication in 2007.

In March 2006, Delsante began a weekly column called Random Shuffle on Comicon.com's comics news website The Pulse. He is a store manager at one of New York's largest comic book retailers, Jim Hanley's Universe.

In August 2006 The Chemistry Set, a webcomics collective of which Delsante is a member, launched. He produces the comic Stuck with Thomas Williams and is currently writing FCHS, a "semi-autobiographical look" at his high school days, with artist Rachel Freire.

In 2007, Delsante was slated to write a three-issue JSA Classified arc with artist Eric Wight. He has written a graphic novel for Simon & Schuster based on the childhood of Albert Einstein. The book, Before They Were Famous, was due out in July 2008. It never was published, but in February 2009, Aladdin published Delsante's biography of Babe Ruth, illustrated by Andrés Vera Martínez, part of the same Before They Were Famous series.

Bibliography
 Batman Adventures #9 ("The Couch", with Dean Haspiel)
 X-Men Unlimited #5 ("Bar Stools", with Lee Ferguson)
 Reflux Comics #3 ("I Love Her Madly", with Michel Fiffe)
 in Beowulf #7 (backup "Fallout, Pt. 1", with Dean Haspiel)
 Scooby-Doo #109-110, 126, 128
 Stuck (The Chemistry Set, with Thomas Williams)
 Superman #676 (Originally Superman Confidential #9; later changed to #8; subsequently canceled by the publisher; now resolicited as stated.)
 Cartoon Network Block Party #42
 Savage Tales #'s 7 & 8
 The Mercury Chronicles #0 (with artist, Mike Lilly)

 FCHS (The Chemistry Set, with artist Rachel Freire)
 Before They Were Famous: Babe Ruth (with artist Andrés Vera Martínez, 2009)
 Twisted Savage Dragon Funnies in Savage Dragon #163, August 2010, with artist Rachel Freire.

References

External links 

 
 The Chemistry Set - Home of Stuck
 SIN Studios Online.com - official Strength In Numbers Studios website
 "Up & Coming: Vito Delsante" - April 2006 interview (by Chris Arrant at Newsarama)
 "Speakeasy Comics Shuts Down" - March 2006 article (by Heidi MacDonald at Publishers Weekly)
 "Writer Man of All Trades: Vito Delsante" - March 2006 interview (by Jen Contino at Comicon.com/The Pulse)
 "Vito Delsante talks about STRAY" - July 13, 2016 interview (by Rik Offenberger at FirstComicsNews.com)

American comics writers
1973 births
Living people
American webcomic creators
American writers of Italian descent
People from Staten Island
People from Brooklyn
People from Ford City, Pennsylvania
University of Pittsburgh alumni